Platinum City F.C. (formerly Polokwane City Rovers) is a South African football club based in the small North West town of Mogwase.

They are currently playing in the National First Division after earning promotion by coming second at the 2020–21 SAFA Second Division playoffs.

References

South African soccer clubs by province